Beshbuloq is an urban-type settlement in Guliston District of Sirdaryo Region in Uzbekistan. It was granted urban-type settlement status in 2009. Its population was 2,898 people in 2016.

References

Populated places in Sirdaryo Region
Urban-type settlements in Uzbekistan